Lance Corporal (U) Mohammad Amir Ajmal bin Mohammad Tahir is a footballer from Brunei who plays as a midfielder.

Amir Ajmal was an international footballer for the Brunei national football team. He was selected for the preliminary squad for the 2012 AFF Suzuki Cup, but ultimately did not feature in the final squad.

His younger brother Aminuddin Zakwan Tahir is also a footballer.

References

External links 
 

Living people
Association football midfielders
Bruneian military personnel
Bruneian footballers
Brunei international footballers
1985 births
MS ABDB players